Turners Crossroads is an unincorporated community in Northampton County, North Carolina, United States, east-northeast of Margarettsville.

References

Unincorporated communities in Northampton County, North Carolina
Unincorporated communities in North Carolina